Gonzalezia may refer to:
 Gonzalezia (wasp), a genus of wasps in the family Encyrtidae
 Gonzalezia (plant), a genus of plants in the family Asteraceae